Kazimir ("Miro") Zalar (born 24 March 1957 in Ljubljana) is a retired Swedish pole vaulter. He was born in Slovenia, but came to Sweden and Karlskrona at a young age.

His personal best jump of 5.70 metres was achieved in 1986 in Nyköping. This was also the Swedish record at the time. In 2007 he ranked seventh on the Swedish all-time list, behind Oscar Janson, Patrik Kristiansson, Martin Eriksson, Alhaji Jeng, Patrik Stenlund and Peter Widén. He has since then also been surpassed by Melker Svärd Jacobsson and Armand Duplantis.

International competitions

References

External links
 

1957 births
Living people
Swedish male pole vaulters
Athletes (track and field) at the 1980 Summer Olympics
Athletes (track and field) at the 1984 Summer Olympics
Olympic athletes of Sweden
Swedish athletics coaches
Sportspeople from Ljubljana
Yugoslav emigrants to Sweden
Swedish people of Slovenian descent